The 1890 Georgetown football team represented the Georgetown University during the 1890 college football season.  Georgetown finished the season with a 3–3–1 record.  During the second game of the season, Columbia AC left the field during the first half with the score 4–0 in favor of Georgetown, and forfeited the game.

Schedule

References

Georgetown
Georgetown Hoyas football seasons
Georgetown football